Cenchris is a taxonomic synonym that may refer to:

 Agkistrodon, a.k.a. moccasins, a genus of venomous vipers found in Central and North America than include, cantils, copperheads and cottonmouths
 Candoia, a.k.a. bevel-nosed boas, a genus of harmless boas found in Melanesia and New Guinea